Teralba railway station is located on the Main Northern line in New South Wales, Australia. It serves the  City of Lake Macquarie suburb of Teralba.

As part of the electrification of the line in the early 1980s, the northbound platform was removed and the southbound platform converted to an island platform to allow the line south of the station to be realigned for faster speeds. The prominent signal box on top of the island platform was removed at the same time. In 2011, the station building was demolished and replaced by a waiting shed.

Platforms & services
Teralba has one platform with two faces. It is serviced by NSW TrainLink Central Coast & Newcastle Line services travelling from Sydney Central to Newcastle.

Transport links
Hunter Valley Buses operates two routes via Teralba station:
270: Toronto West to University of Newcastle
271: Toronto to Stockland Glendale

References

External links

Teralba station details Transport for New South Wales

Railway stations in the Hunter Region
Regional railway stations in New South Wales
Short-platform railway stations in New South Wales, 4 cars
Main North railway line, New South Wales
City of Lake Macquarie